Tralomethrin is a pyrethroid insecticide. 

Tralomethrin has potent insecticidal properties; it kills by modifying the gating kinetics of the sodium channels in neurons, increasing the length of time the channel remains open after a stimulus, thereby depolarizing the neuron for a longer period of time. This leads to uncontrolled spasming, paralysis, and eventual death. Insects with certain mutations in their sodium channel gene may be resistant to tralomethrin and other similar insecticides.

Effectiveness 

Tralomethrin is also effective against most members of class Arachnida as well as insects, in addition studies by the EPA on the ecotoxicity of tralomethrin shows results as follows:

Impact on human health
Tralomethrin is a pyrethroid insecticide. The symptoms of poisoning with pyrethroid compounds are all alike:
 Irritation of skin and eyes.
 Irritability to sound or touch, abnormal facial sensation, sensation of prickling, tingling or creeping on skin, numbness.
 Headache, dizziness, nausea, vomiting, diarrhea, excessive salivation, fatigue.
 In severe cases: fluid in the lungs and muscle twitching may develop. Seizures may occur and are more common with more toxic cyano-pyrethroids.

References

http://iaspub.epa.gov/srs/srs_proc_qry.navigate?P_SUB_ID=357483
https://web.archive.org/web/20050225034305/http://www.arsusda.gov/acsl/services/ppdb/textfiles/TRALOMETHRIN

Tribromomethyl compounds
(cyano-(3-phenoxyphenyl)methyl) 2,2,3-trimethylcyclopropane-1-carboxylates